Stand By may refer to:

"Stand By" (Roman Holliday song), 1983
"Stand By" (Senit song), 2011
"Stand By", a song by Natalie Cole from I Love You So, 1979
"Stand By", a song by Loryn and Rudimental; theme song of the 2019 Cricket World Cup
Stand By, an EP by the Chills, 2004
Stand By (film) a 2011 Bollywood film directed by Sanjay Surkar

See also
Standby (disambiguation)
Stand by Me (disambiguation)